Sharp-Apollo crater is a small crater in Mare Cognitum on the Moon.  The name of the crater was formally adopted by the IAU in 1973.  

The Apollo 12 astronauts Pete Conrad and Alan Bean landed the Lunar Module (LM) Intrepid northeast of Sharp-Apollo crater on November 24, 1969.  The astronauts simply called it Sharp during the mission.  To the east of Sharp is the larger Bench crater.  More distant and to the northeast are Head and Surveyor craters.

References

Impact craters on the Moon
Apollo 12